Harpalus minutulus is a species of ground beetle in the subfamily Harpalinae. It was described by Kataev & Liang in 2004.

References

minutulus
Beetles described in 2004